Heinz Pauck (1904–1986) was a German screenwriter.

Selected filmography
 The Man Who Wanted to Live Twice (1950)
 Fanfares of Love (1951)
 Captain Bay-Bay (1953)
 Jonny Saves Nebrador (1953)
 My Children and I (1955)
 The Girl from Flanders (1956)
 The Zurich Engagement (1957)
 Lemke's Widow (1957)
 The Spessart Inn (1958)
 Wir Wunderkinder (1958)
 The Beautiful Adventure (1959)
 The Angel Who Pawned Her Harp (1959)
 The Haunted Castle (1960)
 Stage Fright (1960)
 The Shadows Grow Longer (1961)
 Schweik's Awkward Years (1964)
 Praetorius (1965)

References

Bibliography 
 Gerd Gemünden. A Foreign Affair: Billy Wilder's American Films. Berghahn Books, 2008.

External links 
 

1904 births
1986 deaths
Mass media people from Bielefeld
20th-century German screenwriters
German male screenwriters
Film people from North Rhine-Westphalia